Physoptychis is a genus of flowering plants of the family Brassicaceae. It contains the following species:
 Physoptychis caspica 
 Physoptychis haussknechtii

References 

Brassicaceae genera
Brassicaceae